The 2007 Invercargill mayoral election commenced on Saturday, 13 October 2007 and was conducted under the First Past the Post system using the postal voting system. It was held as part of the 2007 New Zealand local elections.

The incumbent mayor Tim Shadbolt was comfortably returned to his position with 83% of the vote.

Results
The following table gives the election results:

References

2007 elections in New Zealand
Mayoral elections in Invercargill
October 2007 events in New Zealand